Jason Moore is a retired American soccer midfielder who spent five seasons in Major League Soccer.  He was a member of the United States men's national under-17 soccer team which went to the quarterfinals of the 1993 FIFA U-17 World Championship.

College
Moore attended the University of Virginia where he played two seasons on the men’s soccer team.  In 1997, he played as a defender before moving into the midfield for the 1998 season.  He was a 1998 Second Team All American.  He left college after his sophomore season to turn professional.

Professional
In February 1999, D.C. United selected Moore with the first overall pick of the 1999 MLS College Draft.  On February 18, 2000, United traded Moore to the Colorado Rapids in exchange for the Rapids’ 2001 MLS SuperDraft first round pick.  He spent two seasons with Colorado before being waived.  The Chicago Fire claimed him of waivers in April 2002.  On April 11, 2003, the Fire traded Moore to the New England Revolution for the Fire’s fourth round selection in the 2004 MLS SuperDraft.

International
Moore played four games for the United States men's national under-17 soccer team which went to the quarterfinals of the 1993 FIFA U-17 World Championship.  In 1997, Moore played ten times for the United States men's national under-20 soccer team.

Managerial
In 2013, Jason was named to his first head coaching job at Greater Lowell United FC of the National Premier Soccer League.

References

External links
 D.C. United: Jason Moore
 FIFA: Jason Moore

1978 births
Living people
People from Duluth, Georgia
Sportspeople from the Atlanta metropolitan area
Soccer players from Georgia (U.S. state)
American soccer players
Association football midfielders
Virginia Cavaliers men's soccer players
Major League Soccer first-overall draft picks
D.C. United draft picks
D.C. United players
MLS Pro-40 players
Colorado Rapids players
Chicago Fire FC players
New England Revolution players
Major League Soccer players
A-League (1995–2004) players
United States men's youth international soccer players
United States men's under-20 international soccer players